Sir Wallace Edward Rowling  (15 November 1927 – 31 October 1995), commonly known as Bill Rowling, was a New Zealand politician who was the 30th prime minister of New Zealand from 1974 to 1975. He held office as the parliamentary leader of the Labour Party.

Rowling was a lecturer in economics when he entered politics; he became a Member of Parliament in the 1962 Buller by-election. Not long after entering parliament Rowling began to rise through Labour's internal hierarchy, and he was Party President from 1970 to 1973. He was serving as Minister of Finance (1972–1974) when he was appointed Prime Minister following the death of the highly popular Norman Kirk. His Labour Government's effort to retrieve the economy ended with an upset victory by the National Party in November 1975. Rowling continued to lead the Labour Party but lost two more general elections. Upon retiring from the party's leadership in 1983, he was knighted. He served as Ambassador to the United States from 1985 to 1988.

Early life
Rowling was born in a country suburb of Māriri neighbouring the town of Motueka, near Nelson. He was a member of a long-established farming family. He was educated at Nelson College and the University of Canterbury, gaining a degree in economics. He also attended the Christchurch College of Education (currently, University of Canterbury), qualifying as a teacher. After completing his education, Rowling taught at several schools around the country, including at Motueka, Christchurch, Waverley and in Northland. In 1958, Rowling left teaching and joined the New Zealand Army, becoming assistant director of Army Education. He spent a short amount of time serving abroad in Malaysia and Singapore, a deployment connected with the Malayan Emergency.

Member of Parliament

In the 1960 election, Rowling was selected as the Labour Party's candidate for the Fendalton electorate in Christchurch. Fendalton was regarded as a safe National seat, and Rowling was defeated by the National Party's Harry Lake (who was appointed Minister of Finance in the new National government). Two years later, however, Rowling successfully contested the by-election for Buller, which had been caused by the death of prominent Labour MP Jerry Skinner. Rowling, with a farming background, became Labour's spokesperson on Agriculture and Lands, portfolios previously held by Skinner. Rowling was to hold the Buller seat until the election of 1972, when the seat was dissolved – Rowling then contested successfully the new seat of Tasman, which he did travelling up and down the electorate by Commer campervan, which he lived in for the time.

Not long after entering parliament Rowling began to rise through Labour's internal hierarchy. At the 1966, 1967 and 1968 party conferences Rowling stood for the vice-presidency of the Labour Party, but was narrowly defeated by Henry May on each occasion, however he managed to defeat May in 1969. The following year he was elevated to party presidency. He was the first person to be elected to their first term as president unopposed in Labour history. While Labour was in opposition under Labour leader Norman Kirk Rowling was spokesperson for several portfolios including Overseas Trade, Marketing, Broadcasting, Mines, Planning Development and natural resources.

In the lead up to the 1972 election Kirk tried to persuade Rowling to transfer from the more marginal Tasman seat to the safe Christchurch seat of Avon. Kirk feared Rowling (by then party president) might lose his seat and did not want to lose his economics expertise. Rowling refused on the grounds that such a self interested move would not be befitting of a party president.

Minister of Finance
When the Labour Party won power under Norman Kirk in the 1972 election, Rowling was appointed Minister of Finance. This could be seen as a considerable promotion for someone without prior ministerial experience, though the government was inexperienced as a whole with Labour's deputy leader Hugh Watt the only minister with prior cabinet experience. His allocation of the finance portfolio was contrary to expectation, given Bob Tizard had been the spokesperson when in opposition. Both Warren Freer and Hugh Watt had favoured Tizard for Finance, but Kirk thought he was not steady enough for the role and was suspicious of him as an "intellectual".

As finance minister Rowling imbued nationalistic sentiments, declaring his goal to make sure the country was developed by New Zealanders for New Zealanders and warned that New Zealanders were in danger of losing control of their own country and its industries. The Labour government enjoyed a record budget surplus in its first year and revalued the currency accordingly. However, the slowing global economy, an unprecedented rise in oil prices and a rapid rise in government expenditure led to soaring inflation by 1974.

The remainder of Rowling's term as Minister of Finance was somewhat turbulent; from late in 1973, a series of externally generated crises, of which the 'oil shocks' were the most serious, destabilised the New Zealand economy. These added to other problems, such as growing overseas debt and falling export prices. A major financial policy during Rowling's tenure was a comprehensive superannuation scheme.

Prime Minister

When Norman Kirk died unexpectedly in 1974, Hugh Watt, his deputy, served as acting prime minister for several days while the Labour Party caucus chose a new leader. Rowling was one of several ministers speculated as potentially succeeding Kirk, though Watt was initially seen as the frontrunner. After several other possible candidates ruled themselves out, the field was narrowed to a two-way race between Rowling and Watt, with Rowling now being seen as the front-runner to win. However, the party's National Executive and the Federation of Labour still preferred Watt.

A caucus vote was held on 6 September 1974 where Rowling received a surprisingly large majority, beating Watt 44 votes to 9. At age 46, he became the youngest New Zealand Prime Minister since 1887. Rowling was officially confirmed as party leader and 30th Prime Minister on 6 September 1974. In the cabinet reshuffle following Kirk's death, Rowling took the foreign affairs portfolio. He was appointed to the Privy Council. Rowling had the option of replacing Kirk in the safe Labour seat of Sydenham but chose to remain in his (more marginal) home electorate of Tasman. Rowling considered the idea of holding a snap election under the guise of seeking a personal mandate for himself as Prime Minister. However he was dissuaded from doing so to avoid looking opportunistic and due to Labour having trouble fundraising. Close colleagues in the cabinet were more keen on the idea, but the wider caucus (many of whom held marginal seats) were more reluctant. Agriculture minister Colin Moyle attempted, but failed, to convince Rowling to hold a snap election in October 1974 which he was convinced Labour would have won with the loss of only one or two seats.

Unlike the pro-life Kirk, Rowling was pro-choice. In 1974, he set up a commission to inquire into contraception, sterilisation and abortion. It issued a report in 1977, with recommendations that were incorporated into the Contraception, Sterilisation, and Abortion Act 1977.

Although Rowling also served as Minister of Foreign Affairs, the Labour Government concentrated primarily on domestic affairs. While Rowling's deputy Bob Tizard had replaced him as Minister of Finance, the seriousness of the economic downturn required the Prime Minister's attention. The Government defended heavy overseas borrowing as necessary to protect jobs. In August 1975, the New Zealand dollar was devalued by 15% to assist local manufacturers and exporters. Overall the fiscal outlook during his premiership was overshadowed by the ongoing impacts of the 1973 oil crisis which constrained what could be done. Nevertheless, his government introduced a number of progressive measures, such as an expansion of spending on education by providing a standard bursary for all students in tertiary studies from 1975.

1975 general election

During the 1975 election campaign, Rowling was attacked by the Opposition led by Robert Muldoon, and was generally characterised as being weak and ineffective. Rowling supporters responded with a "Citizens for Rowling" campaign which enlisted high-profile New Zealanders such as Sir Edmund Hillary to praise Rowling's low-key consultative approach. The campaign was labelled as being elitist, and was generally regarded as having backfired on Rowling. The November election resulted in a surprise defeat for the Labour Party, and Rowling was unable to retain the premiership.

Leader of the Opposition

Rowling, however, managed to retain the party leadership though murmurs about the effectiveness of his leadership abounded. His first test as Leader of the Opposition came soon when Labour had to defend one of its seats in early 1976 at a by-election in Nelson. The by-election was seen as crucial to Rowling's future as commentators were suggesting he could not withstand two losses in a row. Labour fought a strong campaign and not only retained the seat but increased their majority as well. The success in Nelson periodically quietened the speculation about Rowling's leadership.

Rowling then had to deal with two scandals involving two of his MPs, his approach to which, were regarded as heavy-handed and unnecessary in many circles. In 1976 Island Bay MP and party vice-president Gerald O'Brien was charged by police for allegedly indecently inviting two boys back to his motel room for a drink. Despite the charges being thrown out, O'Brien was subsequently deselected by Labour as its Island Bay candidate. O'Brien maintained that it was nothing but an attempt by political enemies to "get rid of me". He also stated that he got more sympathy from members of the National Party than from his own party.

This was followed by the 'Moyle Affair', in which Labour MP Colin Moyle was accused by Muldoon of having been 'picked up' by the police the previous year on suspicion of homosexual activities. A Commission of Inquiry ensued and Moyle eventually resigned from Parliament intending to vindicate himself by winning a by-election for his seat of Mangere. Large numbers protested at the 1977 Labour Party Conference; many in the LGBT community never forgave him.

Rowling gradually managed to improve public perceptions of him which were ironically assisted by the Moyle and O'Brien 'affairs' where his public reputation for timidity turned around. The Evening Post reporter Mike Nicolaidi stated "He [Rowling] is considered by some to be 'a mouse' in public, but his roar is being increasingly heard within the party machine." At the 1978 election Rowling led a strong campaign which saw a huge turnaround in Labour's fortunes, actually winning more votes than National. The election night result had National with more seats, but many seats had small majorities and it was conceivable that if special votes overturned enough electorates Labour could form a government. Ultimately this did not eventuate and Labour remained in opposition. Rowling's leadership was credited with the turnaround in public opinion.

Following the 1978 election Rowling alienated some Māori after removing Matiu Rata, the party's experienced and well-regarded Māori Affairs spokesman, from the Opposition front bench. Earlier, Rowling had replaced Rata with himself as convenor of Labour's Māori Affairs Committee. Rata complained about the insensitivity of Labour's Māori policy and went on to form his own Māori rights party, Mana Motuhake. Rata resigned his seat in fought a by-election for his constituency but Labour's candidate Bruce Gregory retained the electorate for Labour.

Labour suffered ructions after Shadow Minister of Transport and Communications Roger Douglas released an "Alternative Budget" against Rowling's wishes. The proposals were not official Labour policy and their publication was seen by Rowling as a challenge to his authority and Douglas was sacked from the shadow cabinet on 30 June 1980. Douglas then became an agitator against Rowling. Throughout 1980, Labour's poll rating steadily declined eventually reaching the point where they were barely ahead of the Social Credit Party (a minor party). In response to this he was subjected to a leadership challenge at the end of the year. Rowling narrowly survived by one vote (his own). He was visibly angered by the challenge, calling his challengers (known as the Fish and Chip Brigade) "nakedly ambitious rats" to the press, a comment which he refused to retract.

At the 1981 election Labour once again secured more votes than the National Party but still failed to gain a majority of seats. Rowling (as in 1978) claimed a moral victory.

Following the election loss there were serious discussions regarding the future of affiliated trade unions in the Labour Party. Labour was frequently attacked for being the 'party of unions' despite only 15% of unions being affiliated and providing just 8% of the annual party funds. In February 1982 Rowling gave a speech at a Labour regional conference in Timaru where he suggested Labour should sever formal links with trade unions, citing the party's public perception being too closely associated with unions and that there had been a large demographic shift in members from the working class to middle-class liberals. Rowling was supported by his Shadow Minister for Labour, Fred Gerbic, and several leading union figures such as national secretary of the New Zealand Electrical and Related Trades Union Tony Neary and secretary of the Wellington Clothing Workers Union Frank Thorn who stated their belief that their affiliation fees were too high and offered little benefit in return. Others such as Jim Knox, the secretary of the New Zealand Federation of Labour and Jim Anderton, the president of the Labour Party, were opposed and argued for a continuing union presence in the party. By March the debate heated up with Rowling and Gerbic publicly expressing another concern that some affiliated unions had members of other parties, in particular the Socialist Unity Party (SUP). Anderton publicly disagreed with Rowling stating that the SUP had no influence in the Labour Party and that "The entire membership of the SUP could be written on the back of a postage stamp." At Labour's annual conference in May 1982 the conference delegates rejected Rowling's proposal and union affiliation remained. As a result of this failure Douglas publicly questioned Rowling's leadership qualities and lack of direction. Rowling did not respond though Anderton staunchly defended Rowling from Douglas' comments.

While Rowling had largely managed to undo his negative image, many people in the Labour Party nevertheless believed that it was time for a change and he announced his retirement from the leadership to the Labour caucus in late 1982. In February 1983 Rowling was succeeded as leader by the charismatic David Lange, who went on to defeat Muldoon in the 1984 election. After relinquishing the leadership he remained on the front bench as Shadow Minister of Foreign Affairs. Rowling retired from parliament at the 1984 election.

Later life and death

After leaving politics, Rowling was appointed by Lange as Ambassador to the United States, serving from 1985 to 1988. He held that position when the issue of nuclear weapons and ANZUS flared up between the United States and New Zealand, and he travelled extensively across the country explaining the policy. He later became president of the New Zealand Institute of International Affairs.

Exasperated at Labour's free-market Rogernomics economic platform initiated by his successor, Rowling eventually let his party membership lapse, expressing dismay at policies undertaken by both the Fourth Labour and Fourth National governments. He was disappointed that the Labour government had disintegrated and led to Lange's resignation as Prime Minister. He felt the caucus made a significant error in re-electing Douglas (who had been a thorn in Rowling's side years earlier) to cabinet which caused Lange to quit. Rowling stated that the vote indicated caucus was "bent on its own political destruction." He was supportive of Helen Clark replacing Mike Moore for the leadership of the Labour Party in 1993. He stated he felt Clark's style of leadership would be better suited to working with other parties such as the Alliance

Rowling later became highly involved in a number of community organisations and trusts. He also played a prominent role at the Museum of New Zealand, and is considered to have been the "driving force" behind the eventual establishment of Te Papa despite drastic public spending cutbacks.

Rowling died of cancer in Nelson on 31 October 1995.

Personal life
Rowling married Glen Reeves in 1951. The couple's second child died when she was five months old in 1957; another daughter, Kim, committed suicide at the age of 18. Rowling was a practising Anglican.

Honours and awards
In the 1983 Queen's Birthday Honours, Rowling was appointed a Knight Commander of the Order of St Michael and St George. He was conferred an honorary law doctorate by the University of Canterbury in 1987, and he was honoured by the Netherlands as a Commander in the Orde van Oranje-Nassau.

In the 1988 Queen's Birthday Honours, Glen, Lady Rowling, was appointed a Companion of the Queen's Service Order for community service.

Notes

References

Further reading 

1927 births
1995 deaths
Ambassadors of New Zealand to the United States
New Zealand finance ministers
New Zealand foreign ministers
New Zealand Labour Party MPs
New Zealand Labour Party leaders
Prime Ministers of New Zealand
New Zealand Knights Commander of the Order of St Michael and St George
Commanders of the Order of Orange-Nassau
University of Canterbury alumni
People educated at Nelson College
People from Motueka
Leaders of the Opposition (New Zealand)
Members of the New Zealand House of Representatives
People associated with the Museum of New Zealand Te Papa Tongarewa
Deaths from cancer in New Zealand
New Zealand MPs for South Island electorates
Unsuccessful candidates in the 1960 New Zealand general election
New Zealand members of the Privy Council of the United Kingdom
New Zealand military personnel of the Malayan Emergency
New Zealand politicians awarded knighthoods
New Zealand schoolteachers